Pick Up is the second studio album by Solex. It was released via Matador Records on September 14, 1999. It peaked at number 34 on CMJ's Radio 200 chart. As with her previous album Solex vs. the Hitmeister (1998), Pick Up is an art pop album that uses samples "in ways that both boggle and seduce".

Reception
Heather Phares of AllMusic gave the album 4 stars out of 5, saying, "Elisabeth Esselink continues to recycle bad music into good, sampling the kitschiest, cheesiest records in her shop and shaping them into her distinctive musical vision." S. Murray of Pitchfork gave the album a 7.6 out of 10, saying, "Pick Up is a strong developmental achievement in the right direction for Solex, and should stand as inspiration for used record store owners the world over." T'Cha Dunlevy of The Gazette called it an unpredictable album where "noise is contorted to suit her melodic ends. Her voice is sweet and dreamy; songs materialize out of abstraction, sounding like they were there all along." They concluded it was a "distinctly creative, skewed and happy album".

Track listing

Personnel
Credits adapted from liner notes.
 Elisabeth Esselink – words, music, production, recording, mixing
 Frank van der Weij – recording, mixing
 Robert Lagendijk – drums (on all tracks except 13)
 Geert de Groot – guitar (on 1, 2, 4, 13, and 14)
 Shane Deleon – clarinet (on  5, 6, 9, 10, and 12)
 Cory Vielma – vocals (on 5 and 6)
 Michael Shamberg – vocals (on 9)

References

External links
 

1999 albums
Solex (musician) albums
Matador Records albums
Art pop albums